Presley Spruance (September 11, 1785 – February 13, 1863) was an American merchant and politician from Smyrna, in Kent County, Delaware. He was a member of the Federalist and later the Whig Party, who served in the Delaware General Assembly and as U.S. Senator from Delaware.

Early life and family
Spruance was born in Kent County, Delaware.

Professional and political career
He was engaged in manufacturing and mercantile pursuits in Smyrna, Delaware, where he was a member of the State House for the 1823 and 1839/40 sessions. In between these he was elected to the State Senate for the sessions from 1826 through 1831, again in 1835/36 and 1837/38, and returned for the 1841/42 and 1843/44 sessions and finally in 1847, several times serving as Speaker. He was elected as a Whig to the United States Senate and served one term from March 4, 1847 to March 3, 1853. Following his term he returned to his business pursuits.

Death and legacy
Spruance died in Smyrna and is buried there in the Presbyterian Cemetery.

A house be built at Smyrna is a contributing property in the Smyrna Historic District.

Almanac
Elections were held the first Tuesday of October. U.S. Representatives were popularly elected March 4 for a two-year term. The General Assembly chose the U.S. Senators, who also took office March 4, but for a six-year term.

Notes

References

External links
Biographical Directory of the U.S. Congress.

Delaware’s Members of Congress

The Political Graveyard 

1785 births
1863 deaths
People from Smyrna, Delaware
Delaware Whigs
Delaware state senators
United States senators from Delaware
Burials in Kent County, Delaware
Whig Party United States senators
Delaware Federalists
19th-century American politicians